The 2019 European 10 m Events Championships was held in Osijek, Croatia, from March 17 to 24, 2019. The competition was held in the Gradski vrt Hall.

Results

Men

Women

Mixed events

Medal table

See also
 European Shooting Confederation
 International Shooting Sport Federation
 List of medalists at the European Shooting Championships
 List of medalists at the European Shotgun Championships

References

External links
Site of the event
Official results
Results book

European 10 m Events Championships
European 10 m Events Championships
International sports competitions hosted by Croatia
European 10 m Events Championships
Sport in Osijek
10m